Weinböhla is a municipality in the district of Meißen, in Saxony, Germany. It is situated 7 km east of Meißen, and 17 km northwest of Dresden.

The municipality can be reached from Dresden by Dresdner Verkehrsbetriebe tram route 4.

References 

 
Meissen (district)